The Church of Preobraženje is a church of the Serbian Orthodox Church, located in the hamlet of Middle River, village of Dajići, Ivanjica. It is on the list of protected cultural property and has the status of cultural monuments.

Architecture
It was built as a cemetery chapel with harmonious proportions, a single-nave with a semicircular apse in a beam, low stone walls, vault and high-shingle roof. The church is surrounded by tall tombstones. One of the few examples of churches at Old Vlac, which the rock material repeats the form of wooden churches. In the church of Preobraženje there is a chandelier of wrought iron fine handicrafts and marble court with sanctified water, probably commissioned for this church. Dining table and a marble baptismal font in the altar area from pre-Turkish period shows that the church was built on the foundations of an older Christian churches.
The church in its present form was built in the late 18th and early 19th centuries, during the settlement of the village Dajići.

References

External links
 Republic Institute for Cultural Heritage Belgrade
 Immovable cultural property
 List of monuments

Ivanjica
Serbian Orthodox church buildings in Serbia